Landhagen is an Amt in the district of Vorpommern-Greifswald, in Mecklenburg-Vorpommern, Germany. The seat of the Amt is in Neuenkirchen.

The Amt Landhagen consists of the following municipalities:
Behrenhoff
Dargelin
Dersekow
Hinrichshagen
Levenhagen
Mesekenhagen
Neuenkirchen
Wackerow
Weitenhagen

References

Ämter in Mecklenburg-Western Pomerania